The Vicars of the Parish Church of St. Mary the Virgin, Aylesbury can be traced back to Adam in 1271. The title of Vicar is very old and arises from the medieval situation where priests were appointed either by a secular lord, by a bishop or by a religious foundation.

List of Vicars
List of Vicars of the Parish Church of St. Mary the Virgin, Aylesbury

References

Lists of Anglicans
Lists of English people by occupation